Alexander Yakovlevich Bulgakov (15 November 178117 April 1863) was a Russian diplomat, senator, and postal administrator.

Biography 
Alexander Bulgakov was born in 1781 in Constantinople in the family of a Russian diplomat, Yakov Bulgakov (1743–1809). At the beginning of his career, Bulgakov worked in the Ministry of Foreign Affairs. He served as an official with special duties attached to the Governor General of Moscow in 1809–1832.

In 1832, Bulgakov stopped his diplomatic career and was appointed to Director of Posts in Moscow. He served in this position in 1832–1856. His younger brother Konstantin Bulgakov  (1782–1835) was the Director of the Saint Petersburg Post Office at that time. Because both were the top officers of the Russian Postal Service, they could freely correspond with each other. Both brothers were much respected by their staff for their effort to improve working conditions for postal workers.

See also 
 Feodor Pryanishnikov
 Konstantin Bulgakov
 Postage stamps and postal history of Russia
 Yakov Bulgakov

References

External links 
 

1781 births
1863 deaths
Russian untitled nobility
Diplomats of the Russian Empire
Senators of the Russian Empire
Russian postmasters
Privy Councillor (Russian Empire)